Die Weltwoche (German for "The World Week") is a Swiss weekly magazine based in Zürich. Founded in 1933, it has been privately owned by Roger Köppel since 2006.

The magazine's regular columnists include the former president of the Social Democratic Party of Switzerland, Peter Bodenmann, as well as Christoph Mörgeli MP, a leading figure of the right wing Swiss People's Party, and cultural and social commentator Alexander, Count von Schönburg-Glauchau.

The magazine's editorial stance under Köppel is considered to range between economic liberalism and conservatism – regularly along the lines of the Swiss People's Party, as critics allege.

History
Founded 1933 as a weekly newspaper in the mold of French weeklies, it started off somewhat sympathetic to the Nazi government of Germany, but soon joined the other Swiss media in vigorously opposing it.

During the 1980s, the newspaper was led by Rudolf Bächtold and Jürg Ramspeck and owned by Jean Frey Verlag. Weltwoche remained a fixture of the intellectual environment in Switzerland, publishing articles, columns and interviews on a wide range of topics, including politics, the economy, culture and science, generally from a center-left perspective. In 1987,  Jean Frey Verlag was bought up by notorious entrepreneur and fraudster Werner Rey. After the collapse of Rey's holdings in 1991, the publisher was sold to Curti Medien Holding AG, which in 1996 passed to Basler Zeitung. The last editor in chief before the takeover by Köppel was Fredy Gsteiger (1997 to 2001), under whom the newspaper pursued a general political position of center-left liberalism.

Köppel became editor-in-chief in 2001, launching a complete redesign, replacing the broadsheet by a magazine format. Jean Frey AG was now bought by Tito Tettamenti. Köppel replaced most of the editors and re-positioned the magazine as neoliberal and right-wing conservative. In 2003, the new Weltwoche began to openly support Christoph Blocher and his Swiss People's Party. This resulted in a  decline in sales, and Köppel was replaced by Simon Heusser, in 2005 followed by Jürg Wildberger.

In 2006, the Weltwoche was detached from Jean Frey AG, now published under its own label Weltwoche Verlag AG. 
The magazine was bought by Köppel, who now also returned as editor-in-chief, resulting in a  renewed exodus of much of the editors. Since 2006, the paper has been run by Köppel directly and has acquired a thoroughly right-wing conservative focus.

2015 the editor-in-chief and owner Roger Köppel joined the strong right-wing Swiss People's Party. Shortly after, he was elected for Councillor of the Swiss Parliament and now stands in for the interest of the Swiss People's Party also in Parliament.

Profile and positions
Already distinguishing itself somewhat from the generally liberal, right-conservative, or center-left Swiss media by its general right-wing orientation, the magazine is now especially noted for its interviews with controversial public figures and for the diversity of opinion represented in its pages, with a dominant right-wing view however. For instance, virtually alone among Swiss publications, Die Weltwoche in 2003 and 2004 printed lengthy articles mainly arguing for the 2003 invasion of Iraq or the reelection of George W. Bush to the U.S. presidency. The accession of Switzerland to the European Union is rejected by the editorial staff, as was Swiss acceptance of the Schengen Agreement. The Weltwoche also represents the view that welfare and other state-administered assistance programs are inherently flawed.

Since 2006, Die Weltwoche has repeatedly actively created controversy and scandal. The magazine is somewhat anti-statist and against an expansion of the welfare state. It also rejects state-subsidized nurseries and childcare.

In keeping with its neo-conservative and anti-mainstream positions, the Weltwoche does not accept the scientific evidence for global warming and has denounced recent "alarmism" surrounding environmental issues. Internationally – outside of Europe – the Weltwoche often represents pro-American and pro-Israeli positions.
 
On 12 January 2006, Die Weltwoche was the first German-speaking publication to reprint some of the controversial cartoons of Muhammad originally published by the Danish newspaper Jyllands-Posten.

On 12 May 2010, the main title of the weekly edition of the Weltwoche was: "Must Islam be Banned?" ("Muss der Islam verboten werden?"), the article stating that Muslim religion is incompatible with the Swiss constitution. The front cover of the Weltwoche of 5 April 2012 published a photograph of a Roma child pointing a gun at a camera under the headline "The Roma are coming". The controversy sparked by this choice of illustration was reported internationally.

On 26 June 2012, Die Weltwoche published an article which lamented the spread of the Irish gene pool and falsely claimed that the Irish Government requires pre-marital DNA testing in an effort to halt supposed widespread incest amongst the Irish who, it was further claimed, have rat-like anatomic features. The article was translated into English and caused controversy in the Irish media.

Circulation
In 1997, Die Weltwoche had a circulation of 91,142 copies. Between July 2004 and June 2005 the circulation of the magazine was 80,436 copies. It was 82,849 copies between July 2005 and June 2006 and 85,772 copies between July 2006 and June 2007. Its total circulation in 2006 was also 82,849 copies. It became 85,096 copies between July 2007 and June 2008, dropping to 45,519 copies in 2019.

Notes

External links
Official website

1933 establishments in Switzerland
Conservatism in Switzerland
Conservative magazines
News magazines published in Europe
German-language magazines
Magazines established in 1933
Magazines published in Zürich
Political magazines published in Switzerland
Weekly magazines published in Switzerland
Weekly news magazines